Doklady Physics: A Journal of the Russian Academy of Sciences is a monthly peer-reviewed scientific journal published by MAIK Nauka/Interperiodica and Springer Science+Business Media. This journal covers Russian to English translations of physics, technical physics, astronomy, and mechanics articles from Doklady Akademii Nauk (English: Proceedings of the Russian Academy of Sciences). The editor-in-chief is Sergey V. Garnov (Prokhorov General Physics Institute). The journal was established in 1956 as Soviet Physics-Doklady and renamed Physics-Doklady in 1993, before obtaining its current title in 1998.

Abstracting and indexing
This journal is abstracted and indexed in:
 Current Contents/Physical, Chemical and Earth Sciences
 Science Citation Index
 Chemical Abstracts Service
 Compendex
 Scopus
 Inspec
 Current Mathematical Publications
 Zentralblatt Math
According to the Journal Citation Reports, the journal has a 2013 impact factor of 0.473.

References

External links 
 

Nauka academic journals
Springer Science+Business Media academic journals
Physics journals
Publications established in 1998
English-language journals